Ust-Ynykchan (Uus Inıkçaan) is a rural locality (a selo), and one of two settlements in Solnechny Urban Okrug of Ust-Maysky District in the Sakha Republic, Russia, in addition to Solnechny, the administrative center of the Urban Okrug. Its population as of the 2002 Census was 12.

References

Notes

Sources
Official website of the Sakha Republic. Registry of the Administrative-Territorial Divisions of the Sakha Republic. Ust-Maysky District. 

Rural localities in Ust-Maysky District